Tiab or Tiyab or Teyab may refer to:

Places
Iran
 Tiab, Fars, Fars Province
 Tiab, Hajjiabad, Hormozgan Province
 Tiab, Minab, Hormozgan Province
 Tiab (27°18′ N 57°38′ E), Manujan, Kerman Province
 Tiab (27°30′ N 57°41′ E), Manujan, Kerman Province
 Tiab, Sistan and Baluchestan
 Tiab Rural District, in Hormozgan Province